The McLeod Building is a historic office building located in Downtown Edmonton. It was designated a Provincial Historic Resource on January 3, 1995 and a Municipal Historic Resource on May 22, 2001.

History

Kenneth McLeod was a former Edmonton alderman, contractor and real estate speculator, who in 1912 announced the construction of the McLeod Building, which he claimed would be the tallest in the city,  taller than the Tegler Building. Architect John K. Dow was instructed to copy the Paulsen Building in Spokane, Washington, which he had also built. The construction began in 1913 and was completed in 1915. Despite McLeod's claim about the building projected to be the tallest in Edmonton, the Alberta Legislature Building in the same city had already surpassed the height claimed by McLeod in 1913. The McLeod Building is considered Alberta’s best remaining example of an architectural style for commercial buildings known as the Chicago School.

References

External links
 TheMcLeod.ca
 The McLeod Building Facebook Page

Buildings and structures in Edmonton
Office buildings completed in 1915
1915 establishments in Alberta
Municipal Historic Resources of Edmonton
Chicago school architecture in Canada
Provincial Historic Resources of Alberta